Shaun Patrick Price (born March 24, 1955) is a Canadian former professional ice hockey player who played in the World Hockey Association (WHA) for the Vancouver Blazers and the National Hockey League (NHL) for the New York Islanders, Edmonton Oilers, Pittsburgh Penguins, Quebec Nordiques, New York Rangers and Minnesota North Stars. He reached the NHL playoff semifinals four times, three times with the Islanders and once with the Nordiques.

Early life
Born in Nelson, British Columbia, Price was a highly-touted junior star with the Saskatoon Blades of the Western Canada Hockey League (WCHL), with 95 points, despite being a defenseman, in the 1973–74 WCHL season. He was a member of the WCHL All-Star Team in 1974.

Career 
In the 1974 WHA Amateur Draft, Price was drafted first overall by the Vancouver Blazers. The WHA had trouble holding onto its draft picks, who often went to the more established NHL teams, but the Blazers landed the untested rookie with a contract offer of $1.3 million ($ million today).

Price did not meet the Blazers' expectations, with 34 points in the 1974–75 WHA season, and he went to the NHL after being drafted 11th overall by the New York Islanders in the 1975 NHL Amateur Draft. Price spent most of that season in the minor leagues, as he learned the professional game.

Price became an NHL regular in 1976–77, and played three seasons with the Islanders before he was claimed by the Edmonton Oilers in the 1979 NHL Expansion Draft.

Despite the original expectation that he should be a scoring defenseman with Vancouver in his rookie season, Price grew to be a balanced professional, playing 726 total NHL games over 13 seasons, scoring 43 goals and having 218 assists before retiring in 1988.

After retiring, Price returned to his hometown of Nelson, British Columbia.

Career statistics

References

External links
 

1955 births
Canadian ice hockey defencemen
Edmonton Oilers players
Fredericton Express players
Ice hockey people from British Columbia
Kalamazoo Wings (1974–2000) players
Living people
Minnesota North Stars players
National Hockey League first-round draft picks
New York Islanders draft picks
New York Islanders players
New York Rangers players
People from Nelson, British Columbia
Pittsburgh Penguins players
Quebec Nordiques players
Rochester Americans players
Saskatoon Blades players
Vancouver Blazers draft picks
Vancouver Blazers players
World Hockey Association first-overall draft picks